Blueberry Island may refer to:

 Blueberry Island (Quebec), an island in Quebec's Lac Marois
 Blueberry Island (Massachusetts), an island in Massachusetts